The 2022 Southern Conference men's basketball tournament was the postseason men's basketball tournament for the Southern Conference (SoCon) for the 2021–22 season. All tournament games were played at the Harrah's Cherokee Center in Asheville, North Carolina, during March 4–7, 2022. The winner of the tournament received the conference's automatic bid to the 2022 NCAA Division I men's basketball tournament.

In the championship game, David Jean-Baptiste scored a buzzer-beating three-pointer to give Chattanooga a 64–63 overtime win over Furman. It was Chattanooga's first SoCon men's basketball title since 2016.

Seeds
All ten teams in the Southern Conference were eligible to compete in the conference tournament. Teams were seeded by record within the conference, with a tiebreaker system to seed teams with identical conference records. Tiebreakers used are 1) head-to-head results, 2) comparison of records against individual teams in the conference starting with the top-ranked team and working down and 3) NCAA NET rankings on the first available report after the regular season is complete. Samford was seeded over Wofford due to having a better record against conference top seed Chattanooga. VMI was seeded over UNC Greensboro due to having a better record against Mercer. The top six teams received first-round byes.

Schedule and results

Bracket

See also
2022 Southern Conference women's basketball tournament

References

Tournament
Southern Conference men's basketball tournament
Basketball competitions in Asheville, North Carolina
College sports tournaments in North Carolina
College basketball in North Carolina
Southern Conference men's basketball tournament
Southern Conference men's basketball tournament